The term ultra-leftism, when used among Marxist groups, is a pejorative for certain types of positions on the far-left that are extreme or uncompromising. Another definition historically refers to a particular current of Marxist communism, where the Comintern rejected social democratic parties and all other progressive groupings outside of the Communist Party.

Historical usage 

The term ultra-left is rarely used in English. Instead, people tend to speak broadly of left communism as a variant of traditional Marxism. The French equivalent, has a stronger meaning in that language and is used to define a movement that still exists today: a branch of left communism developed by theorists such as Amadeo Bordiga, Otto Rühle, Anton Pannekoek, Herman Gorter, and Paul Mattick, and continuing with more recent writers, such as Jacques Camatte and Gilles Dauvé. This standpoint includes two main traditions, a Dutch-German tradition including Rühle, Pannekoek, Gorter, and Mattick, and an Italian tradition following Bordiga. These traditions came together in the 1960s French ultra-gauche. The political theorist Nicholas Thoburn refers to these traditions as the "actuality of... the historical ultra-left". 

The term originated in the 1920s in the German and Dutch workers movements, originally referring to a Marxist group opposed to both Bolshevism and social democracy, and with some affinities with anarchism. Ultra-left is often used by Marxist–Leninists and Trotskyists against other communists who advocate a program which those who use the term may consider to be without regard of the current political consciousness or of the long-term consequences that would result from following a proposed course, often citing what they view as material conditions that would prevent such a programme from being feasible.

The ultra-left is defined particularly by its breed of anti-authoritarian Marxism, which generally involves an opposition to the state and to state socialism, as well as to parliamentary democracy and wage labour. In opposition to Bolshevism, the ultra-left generally places heavy emphasis upon the autonomy and self-organization of the proletariat. It rejected the necessity of a revolutionary party and was described as permanently counterposing "the masses" to their leaders. Dauvé also explained:
The ultra-left was born and grew in opposition to Social Democracy and Leninism—which had become Stalinism. Against them, it affirmed the revolutionary spontaneity of the proletariat. The German communist left (in fact German-Dutch), and its derivatives, maintained that the only human solution lay in proletarians' own activity, without it being necessary to educate or to organize them... Inheriting the mantle of the ultra-left after the war, the magazine  appeared in France between 1949 and 1965.
 
One variant of ultra-leftist ideas was widely revived in the New Left of the 1960s, and particularly in the May 1968 moment in libertarian socialist movements such as Big Flame, the Situationist International, and autonomism. During the May 1968 events in France, ultra-leftism was initially associated with the opposition and critique to the French Communist Party (PCF). Ultra-leftism was thus used by the established currents of the communist movement to prevent, sometimes correctly, against "self-indulgent ultra-leftism [that] could only make it more difficult for the revolutionary left to win rank and file PCF members away from their leaders″.

Pejorative usage 

Used pejoratively, ultra-left is used to label positions that are adopted without taking notice of the current situation or of the consequences which would result from following a proposed course. The term is used to criticize leftist positions that, for example, are seen as overstating the tempo of events, propose initiatives that overestimate the current level of militancy, or which employ appeals to violence in their activism.
 
The mainstream Marxist critique of such a position began with Vladimir Lenin's "Left-Wing" Communism: An Infantile Disorder, which critiqued those (such as Anton Pannekoek or Sylvia Pankhurst) in the nascent Communist International, who argued against cooperation with parliamentary or reformist socialists. Lenin characterized the ultra-left as a politics of purity—the doctrinal "repetition of the 'truths' of pure communism". Leninists typically used the term against their rivals on the left: "the Communist Party's Betty Reid wrote in a 1969 pamphlet Ultra-Leftism in Britain that the CPGB made 'no exclusive claim to be the only force on the left', but dismissed the groups to the left of the CPGB as the 'ultra-left', with Reid outlining the ultra-left as groups that were Trotskyist, anarchist or syndicalist or those that 'support the line of the Communist Party of China during the Sino-Soviet Split' (pp. 7–8)".

Trotskyists and others stated the Communist International was pursuing a strategy of unrealistic ultra-leftism during its Third Period, which the Communist International later admitted when it turned to a united front strategy in 1934–35. The term has been popularized in the United States by the Socialist Workers Party at the time of the Vietnam war, using the term to describe opponents in the anti-war movement including Gerry Healy. Ultra-leftism is often associated with leftist sectarianism, in which a socialist organization might attempt to put its own short-term interests before the long-term interests of the working class and its allies.

See also 
 Anti-Stalinist left
 Centrist Marxism
 Libertarian Marxism
 Left communism in China

References

Further reading 
 Bahne, Siegfried, 'Zwischen' Luxemburgismus' und 'Stalinismus', die ultralinke Opposition in der KPD, in Vierteljahreshefte für Zeitgeschichte, 4/1961, pp. 359–383. 
 
 Hoffrogge, Ralf. "Marcel Bois, Kommunisten gegen Hitler und Stalin--Die Linke Opposition der KPD in der Weimarer Republik. Eine Gesamtdarstellung" Twentieth Century Communism, no. 10, 2016, p. 139+. Academic OneFile, Accessed 7 September 2017.
 O. Langels Die Ultralinke Opposition der KPD in der Weimarer Republik (Frankfurt am Main: Verlag Peter Lang, 1984)

External links 
 Libertarian Communist Library – an archive of libertarian, left and ultra-left communist texts
 Gilles Dauvé (1969) "Leninism and the Ultra-Left" in Gilles Dauvé and François Martin, The Eclipse and Re-Emergence of the Communist Movement, 63–75. Rev. ed. London: Antagonism Press.
 Peter Camejo, Liberalism, Ultra-Leftism or mass action
 Abbie Bakan, Ultraleftism: left words, sectarian practice
 International Luxemburgist Network (Anti-Leninist)

Far-left politics
Political spectrum
Political theories
Soviet phraseology